Aughrim County Ground, known for sponsorship reasons as Echelon Park Aughrim, is a GAA stadium in Aughrim, County Wicklow, Ireland. Aughrim County Ground is the name of the home of Gaelic Games for County Wicklow (Gaelic football, Hurling, Camogie, Ladies Football) team. The ground has a capacity of about 7,000. The name "O'Byrne Park" was occasionally used in the past, but this has never been the official name: this mistake that came about because of the Irish name for the local village of Aughrim, "Aughrim of the O'Byrnes" (Eachdhruim Uí Bhroin). Also known locally as "The Pitch", or just "The Field".

See also
 List of Gaelic Athletic Association stadiums
 List of stadiums in Ireland by capacity

References

Gaelic games grounds in the Republic of Ireland
Sports venues in County Wicklow
Wicklow GAA